O'Meara (Meara, O'Mara, Mara, Marah) is an Irish surname, anglicised from Ó Meadhra, originating in County Tipperary, and may refer to:
 Andrew P. O'Meara (1907–2005), United States Army general 
 Barry Edward O'Meara (1786–1836), Irish surgeon
 Basil O'Meara (1892-1971), Canadian sports journalist
 Brian O'Meara (rugby union) (born 1976), Irish rugby union footballer
 Brian O'Meara (hurler) (born 1990), Irish hurler
 Brian O'Meara (Mullinahone hurler) (born 1973), Irish hurler for the Tipperary senior team
 Colin O'Meara (born 1963), voice actor
 David O'Meara, Canadian poet
 Dermod O'Meara, Irish physician, poet and parent of Edmund O'Meara
 Edmund O'Meara (1614–1681), Irish physiologist and child of Dermod O'Meara
 Edward O'Meara (1921–1992), American prelate of the Roman Catholic Church
 Eileen O'Meara, American artist
 Frank O'Meara (1853–1888), Irish artist
 Ger O'Meara (born 1985), hurler and Gaelic footballer
 Jaeger O'Meara (born 1994), professional Australian rules footballer
 James O'Meara (1919–1974), Royal Air Force officer and fighter pilot
 Jane O'Meara Sanders (born 1950), American social worker, college administrator and political staffer
 Jo O'Meara (born 1979), English singer-songwriter, television personality and actress
 John Corbett O'Meara (born 1933), United States federal judge
 John O'Meara (politician) (1856–1904), Liberal Party Member of Parliament in New Zealand
 John J. O'Meara (1915–2003), Irish classical scholar and historian of ancient and medieval philosophy
 John O'Meara (born 1977), American Police Officer, Deputy Chief of Police
 Kathleen O'Meara (politician) (born 1960), Irish politician
 Kathleen O'Meara (writer) (1839–1888), Irish-French Catholic writer
 Mark O'Meara (born 1957), American professional golfer
 Martin O'Meara (1885–1935), Irish-born Australian recipient of the Victoria Cross
 Mike O'Meara (born 1959), podcast personality
 O. Timothy O'Meara (1928–2018), American mathematician
 Patrick O'Meara (born 1947), Master of Van Mildert College and Professor at Durham University
 Patrick O. O'Meara (1938–2021), author and professor
 Peter O'Meara (born 1969), Irish actor
 Peter O'Meara (rugby union), CEO of the Western Force rugby union team
 Richard O'Meara, United States Brigadier General 
 Ryan O'Meara (born 1984), American ice dancer
 Shane O'Meara (born 1992), Irish actor
 Walter O'Meara (1897–1989), American author

Meara
 Anne Meara (1929–2015), American actress and comedian

O'Mara
 James O'Mara (1873–1948), Irish businessman and politician
 Jared O'Mara (born 1981), British politician
 Jason O'Mara (born 1972), Irish-American actor
 Joseph O'Mara (1864–1927), Irish opera singer
 Kate O'Mara (1939–2014), English actress and writer

Mara
 Jack Mara (1908–1965), co-owner of the New York Giants
 John Mara (born 1954), president, CEO, and co-owner of the New York Giants
 Kate Mara (born 1983), American actress and fashion model
 Rooney Mara (born 1985), American actress and fashion designer
 Tim Mara (1887–1959), founder and administrator of the New York Giants and grandparent of Timothy J. Mara
 Timothy J. Mara (c. 1935 – 1995), American businessman, part owner of the New York Giants football team, and grandchild of Tim Mara
 Wellington Mara (1916–2005), co-owner of the New York Giants and child of Tim Mara

See also
 Meara (disambiguation)

OMeara
OMeara